"Young & Sexy" is the debut single by American R&B recording trio, Lyric. The song was produced by Jack Knight and Steve Estiverne and was co-written by background vocalist, Kia Jeffries. It also featured a guest appearance from former Bad Boy recording artist, Loon. The song is also noted for its publication under Sean "Diddy" Combs' publishing company, Justin Combs Publishing. The song peaked at #79 on Billboard Hot R&B/Hip-Hop Songs and served as the lead single for Lyric's unreleased self-titled debut album. It was also featured on the record-breaking, platinum-selling video game soundtrack, NBA Live 2003 and in the 2002 film, The Hot Chick.

Music video
A music video for the song was shot in New Jersey and premiered on BET's 106 & Park in mid-September 2002.

Track listings
 CD single
 "Young & Sexy" (Radio Edit) — 3:55   
 "Young & Sexy" (Radio Edit Without Rap) — 3:13   
 "Young & Sexy" (Instrumental) — 3:55   
 "Young & Sexy" (Call Out Hook) — 0:10

 12" vinyl
 "Young & Sexy" (Main) — 4:19 
 "Young & Sexy" (Instrumental) — 4:21 
 "Young & Sexy" (Main) — 4:19 
 "Young & Sexy" (Acappella) — 4:03

Chart performance

References

2002 singles
2002 songs
Songs written by Jack Knight (songwriter)